John Watson MacNaught,  (June 19, 1904 – December 25, 1984) was a Canadian politician.

Born in Coleman, Prince Edward Island, he was first elected to the House of Commons of Canada representing the riding of Prince in the 1945 federal election. A Liberal, he was re-elected in 1949 and 1953. He was defeated in 1957 and in 1958. He was re-elected in 1963 and was defeated in 1965. He was defeated again in 1974. He was the Parliamentary Assistant to the Minister of Fisheries. From 1963 to 1965, he was the Solicitor General of Canada and a Minister without Portfolio. In 1965, he was the Minister of Mines and Technical Surveys.

References

1904 births
1984 deaths
People from Prince County, Prince Edward Island
Canadian Presbyterians
Liberal Party of Canada MPs
Members of the House of Commons of Canada from Prince Edward Island
Members of the King's Privy Council for Canada
Solicitors General of Canada